William Alfred Seiter (June 10, 1890 – July 26, 1964) was an American film director.

Life and career
Seiter was born in New York City. After attending Hudson River Military Academy, Seiter broke into films in 1915 as a bit player at Mack Sennett's Keystone Studios, doubling as a cowboy. He graduated to director in 1918.

At Universal Studios in the mid-1920s, Seiter was principal director of the popular movies with Reginald Denny, most of which co-starred Seiter's then wife Laura La Plante (his second wife was actress Marian Nixon). This period also included The Beautiful and Damned and The Family Secret.

In the early sound era, Seiter helped nurture the talents of RKO's comedy duo Wheeler & Woolsey in features such as Caught Plastered (1931) and Diplomaniacs (1933). He also directed  Laurel and Hardy in Sons of the Desert (1933), generally regarded as one of their better feature films. Seiter's other films include Sunny, Going Wild, Kiss Me Again, Hot Saturday, Way Back Home, Girl Crazy, Rafter Romance, Roberta, Room Service, Susannah of the Mounties, Allegheny Uprising, You Were Never Lovelier, Up in Central Park, One Touch of Venus.

Among the many stars directed by Seiter during his long career were Shirley Temple, Fred Astaire, Ginger Rogers, Irene Dunne, Henry Fonda, Margaret Sullavan, Barbara Stanwyck, Jack Haley, Deanna Durbin, Jean Arthur, John Wayne, Fred MacMurray, Lucille Ball, Rita Hayworth and the Marx Brothers.

As a director, on occasion, if he ran into friction from his star—as was the case with Lou Costello in 1946's Little Giant—Seiter would get even by adhering religiously to the script, refusing to add any nuance or creativity to the project (this pettiness may have been the reason that one prominent actress of the 1930s referred to Seiter as the most unimaginative director she'd ever worked with). On his final four films, before he retired in 1954, Seiter functioned as both producer and director. These films included The Lady Wants Mink (1953), a gentle satire of the then topical "raise your own coat" craze.

He died in Beverly Hills, California of a heart attack, aged 74. Seiter was buried at Forest Lawn Memorial Park in Glendale, California. His second wife, actress Marion Nixon, is buried there as well. The ashes of his first wife Laura La Plante were scattered at sea. His grandson, with Nixon, is screenwriter Ted Griffin.

Most of the films Seiter directed with the Wheeler/Woolsey duo have been released on two DVDs by Warner Archive.

Filmography

 Make Haste to Live (1954)
 Champ for a Day (1953)
 The Lady Wants Mink (1953)
 Dear Brat (1951)
 Borderline (1950)
 Gems of Song (1949, short)
 One Touch of Venus (1948)
 Up in Central Park (1948)
 I'll Be Yours (1947)
 Lover Come Back (1946)
 Little Giant (1946)
 That Night with You (1945)
 The Affairs of Susan (1945)
 It's a Pleasure (1945)
 Belle of the Yukon (1944)
 Four Jills in a Jeep (1944)
 A Lady Takes a Chance (1943)
 Destroyer (1943)
 You Were Never Lovelier (1942)
 Broadway (1942)
 Appointment for Love (1941)
 Nice Girl? (1941)
 It's a Date (1940)
 Hired Wife (1940)
 Allegheny Uprising (1939)
 Susannah of the Mounties (1939)
 The Little Princess (1939)
 Thanks for Everything (1938)
 Room Service (1938)
 Three Blind Mice (1938)
 Sally, Irene and Mary (1938)
 Life Begins in College (1937)
 The Life of the Party (1937)
 This Is My Affair (1937)
 Stowaway (1936)
 Dimples (1936)
 The Case Against Mrs. Ames (1936)
 The Moon's Our Home (1936)
 If You Could Only Cook (1935)
 In Person (1935)
 Orchids to You (1935)
 The Daring Young Man (1935)
 Roberta (1935)
 The Richest Girl in the World (1934)
 We're Rich Again (1934)
 Love Birds (1934)
 Sing and Like It (1934)
 Sons of the Desert (1933)
 Chance at Heaven (1933)
 Rafter Romance (1933)
 Professional Sweetheart (1933)
 Diplomaniacs (1933)
 Hello, Everybody! (1933)
 If I Had a Million (1932)
 Hot Saturday (1932)
 Is My Face Red?(1932)
 Young Bride (1932)
 Girl Crazy (1932)
 Peach O'Reno (1931)
 Way Back Home (1931)
 Caught Plastered (1931)
 Too Many Cooks (1931)
 Big Business Girl (1931)

 Kiss Me Again (1931)
 L'aviateur (1931)
 Going Wild (1930)
 Sunny (1930)
 The Truth About Youth (1930)
 Back Pay (1930)
 The Flirting Widow (1930)
 Strictly Modern (1930)
 The Love Racket (1929)
 Footlights and Fools (1929)
 Smiling Irish Eyes (1929)
 Prisoners (1929)
 Why Be Good? (1929)
 Synthetic Sin (1929)
 Outcast (1928)
 Waterfront (1928)
 Happiness Ahead (1928)
 Good Morning, Judge (1928)
 Thanks for the Buggy Ride (1928)
 The Small Bachelor (1927)
 Out All Night (1927)
 The Cheerful Fraud (1926)
 Take It from Me (1926)
 Rolling Home (1926)
 Skinner's Dress Suit (1926)
 What Happened to Jones (1926)
 Where Was I? (1925)
 The Teaser (1925)
 Dangerous Innocence (1925)
 The Mad Whirl (1925)
 The Fast Worker (1924)
 Helen's Babies (1924)
 The Family Secret (1924)
 Listen Lester (1924)
 His Forgotten Wife (1924)
 The White Sin (1924)
 Daddies (1924)
 Little Church Around the Corner (1923)
 Bell Boy 13 (1923)
 When Love Comes (1922)
 The Beautiful and Damned (1922)
 Up and at 'Em (1922)
 The Understudy (1922)
 Gay and Devilish (1922)
 Boy Crazy (1922)
 Eden and Return (1921)
 The Foolish Age (1921)
 Passing Through (1921)
 Hearts and Masks (1921)
 The Kentucky Colonel (1920)
 A Sure Cure (1919)
 The Little Dears (1919)
 Moving Day (1919)
 Why Divorce? (1919)
 Honeymooning (1919)
 Close to Nature (1919)
 After the Bawl (1919)
 Their Day of Rest (1919)
 In a Pinch (1919)
 Gold-Bricking Cupid (1915)
 The Honeymoon Roll (1915)

References

External links 

 
 

1890 births
1964 deaths
Film directors from New York City
People from Greater Los Angeles
Film directors from California
Burials at Forest Lawn Memorial Park (Glendale)